Ingrid Monson is Quincy Jones Professor of African-American Music, supported by the Time Warner Endowment, and Professor of African and African American studies at Harvard University.

Education 
Monson earned a Bachelor of Music from New England Conservatory of Music and a Bachelor of Arts from the University of Wisconsin-Madison, where she studied economics. She later earned an M.A. and Ph.D. in musicology from New York University.

Reception 
In February 2022, Monson was one of 38 Harvard faculty to sign a letter to the Harvard Crimson defending Professor John Comaroff, who had been found to have violated the university's sexual and professional conduct policies. The letter defended Comaroff as "an excellent colleague, advisor and committed university citizen" and expressed dismay over his being sanctioned by the university.  After students filed a lawsuit with detailed allegations of Comaroff's actions and the university's failure to respond, Monson was one of several signatories to say that she wished to retract her signature.

Works
 Saying Something: Jazz Improvisation and Interaction (University of Chicago Press, 1996)
 Freedom Sounds: Civil Rights Call Out to Jazz and Africa (Oxford University Press, 2007)
 ed. African Diaspora: A Musical Perspective (Garland/Routledge, 2000)

References

External links
 Music Division: Ingrid Monson Oral History - Interview at the Library of Congress, March 6, 2017

Living people
Black studies scholars
Harvard University faculty
University of Wisconsin–Madison College of Letters and Science alumni
New York University alumni
American musicologists
Year of birth missing (living people)
American women non-fiction writers
American women academics
21st-century American women